Pomona is a play by Alistair McDowall that was commissioned for The Royal Welsh College of Music & Drama in 2014 and performed at The Gate Theatre in London as part of the NEW festival of plays. It then went on to the Orange Tree Theatre in Richmond, South West London, in November 2014.

The play centres on Ollie who is searching for her missing sister in Manchester. In desperation, she finds all roads lead to Pomona, an abandoned concrete island at the heart of the city. Here at the centre of everything, journeys end and nightmares are born. The play's structure is episodic and non-chronological, suggesting that Ollie's sister may not exist.

The production was directed by Ned Bennett, designed by Georgia Lowe, lighting by Elliot Griggs and sound by Giles Thomas.

It was a critical success and featured in Lyn Gardner's Top 10 Theatre of 2014. The production transferred to the National Theatre and the Royal Exchange Theatre in Autumn 2015.

Characters

Ollie
Fay
Gale
Keaton
Zeppo
Charlie
Moe

References

External links
2014 audio interview with Alistair McDowall for TheatreVoice about Pomona
Audio recording of a post-show discussion with Alistair McDowall after a performance of Pomona at the National Theatre in 2015 
Article written by Alistair McDowall for the Guardian Theatre Blog which mentions his influences when creating Pomona

2014 plays
English plays
Thriller plays